Samiabad-e Hajji Aman (also Romanized as Samī‘ābād-e Ḩājjī Amān; also known as Ḩājjī Amān) is a village in Zam Rural District, Pain Jam District, Torbat-e Jam County, Razavi Khorasan Province, Iran. At the 2006 census, its population was 266, in 60 families.

References 

Populated places in Torbat-e Jam County